Gerónimo de la Concepción (Cádiz, 1642 - Córdoba, 1698) was a spanish carmelite and writer.

Works 
 Emporio del Orbe, Cádiz ilustrada, the only one being published.
There are also other works that were not published: 
 Catálogo de los Arzobispos de Sevilla (incomplete).
 Dos discursos por la primacía de la santa Metropolitana y Patriarcal Iglesia de Sevilla.
 Tres discursos sobre el templo mayor de Sevilla, su origen, progresos y descripción.

References 

Content in this edit is from the existing Spanish Wikipedia article at :es:Gerónimo de la Concepción; see its history for attribution.

Spanish male writers
People from Cádiz
1642 births
1698 deaths